Dhoular is a village and union council of Talagang District in the Punjab Province of Pakistan, and is part of Talagang Tehsil.

According to the 1998 census of Pakistan, its total population was about 6,500. It is one of the oldest, largest and culturally rich village of the area. It is referred to, in the famous saying: The Sword is in Dhaualr (meaning that it is the time to fight but my ammunition is not with me, rather I had left that at home).
It is a part of the Pothohar Plateau. It is a fertile area but there is no irrigation system available in the entire Rawalpindi Division.

By its area, Dhoular is 2nd largest village in the Tehsil. There are many people born in this village, which are very much famous not in the surroundings but on International level as well. Mr. Syed Hussain Imam Haider (First Pakistani who has done Phd in WTO ) and famous journalist Mr. Syyed Owais Ahmed Hamdani also belongs to this village.

References

Union councils of Chakwal District
Populated places in Chakwal District